Tuttletown (formerly, Mormon Gulch and Tuttleville) is a census-designated place (CDP) in Tuolumne County, California. It is located on State Route 49 near the gold rush community of Columbia. The 2010 United States census reported Tuttletown's population was 668.

History
Tuttletown is registered as a California Historical Landmark. The community was originally known as Mormon Gulch, because of a company of Mormons who began mining gold there in 1848. Toward the end of the summer, however, Judge A. A. H. Tuttle settled at the place and built a log cabin. His tavern became the focal point of the village that became Tuttletown.

Geography
According to the United States Census Bureau, the CDP covers an area of 7.4 square miles (19.1 km), 99.91% of it land and 0.09% of it water.

Demographics
The 2010 United States Census reported that Tuttletown had a population of 668. The racial makeup of Tuttletown was 613 (91.8%) White, 5 (0.7%) African American, 14 (2.1%) Native American, 5 (0.7%) Asian, 1 (0.1%) Pacific Islander, 12 (1.8%) from other races, and 18 (2.7%) from two or more races. Hispanic or Latino of any race were 48 persons (7.2%).

The Census reported that 668 people (100% of the population) lived in households, 0 (0%) lived in non-institutionalized group quarters, and 0 (0%) were institutionalized.

There were 293 households, out of which 61 (20.8%) had children under the age of 18 living in them, 150 (51.2%) were opposite-sex married couples living together, 25 (8.5%) had a female householder with no husband present, 17 (5.8%) had a male householder with no wife present.  There were 23 (7.8%) unmarried opposite-sex partnerships, and 4 (1.4%) same-sex married couples or partnerships. 75 households (25.6%) were made up of individuals, and 34 (11.6%) had someone living alone who was 65 years of age or older. The average household size was 2.28.  There were 192 families (65.5% of all households); the average family size was 2.73.

The population was spread out, with 114 people (17.1%) under the age of 18, 38 people (5.7%) aged 18 to 24, 99 people (14.8%) aged 25 to 44, 269 people (40.3%) aged 45 to 64, and 148 people (22.2%) who were 65 years of age or older.  The median age was 51.7 years. For every 100 females, there were 93.1 males.  For every 100 females age 18 and over, there were 96.5 males.

The homeowner vacancy rate was 2.6%; the rental vacancy rate was 13.2%.  513 people (76.8% of the population) lived in owner-occupied housing units and 155 people (23.2%) lived in rental housing units.

California Historical Landmark
Tuttletownis a California Historical Landmark.
California Historical Landmark number 124 reads:
NO. 124 TUTTLETOWN - This early-day stopping place for men and mounts was named for Judge Anson A. H. Tuttle, who built the first log cabin here in 1848. Stones used in the base for the plaque are from the old Swerer store built in 1854, remains of which still exist (1949). Mark Twain traded here. Tuttletown Hotel, built in 1852 and still standing in 1949, was last operated by John Edwards.

See also
California Historical Landmarks in Tuolumne County, California

References

External links
History of California by Theodore Henry Hittell
Tuttletown, CA, profile

Census-designated places in Tuolumne County, California
Census-designated places in California
California Historical Landmarks